Urs Hans von Aesch was a Swiss citizen suspected of the 2007 abduction and murder of five-year-old Ylenia Lenhard in Appenzell, Switzerland.

Abduction and suspected murder of Ylenia Lenhard 
Von Aesch apparently committed suicide by shooting himself in the head on July 31, 2007, a few hours after Lenhard disappeared, and shortly after shooting a 46-year-old man. Von Aesch's body was found the following day. A backpack with Lenhard's clothes inside and her cycling helmet were found near von Aesch's body and was found to carry his DNA. Traces of Lenhard's DNA were also found in a white van owned by von Aesch, containing a mattress that he had been using to sleep on.

Witnesses have said a man matching von Aesch's description had been seen outside the public bath in Appenzell for at least 10 days.

Swiss police announced on September 15, 2007 that a body had been discovered in the woods between the villages of Oberbüren and Niederwil considered almost certain to be Lenhard's. On September 16 2007 the Swiss police confirmed that the found body was in fact the remains of Lenhard. The man who found the body received a reward of approximately $20,000. The sum was gathered by authorities and relatives to keep the search going.

The finder stated: "If the wild animals hadn't dug her up from the 1–2 foot deep hole where she was buried, probably no one would have ever found her." Wild animals had torn parts of the body, especially the upper torso, apart. This forced forensics to identify the body with a DNA match. Police think it is very probable that she was the victim of a rape-murder crime. Although on September 19, 2007, the police said, they didn't find any evidence that she was raped before or after she was murdered. The cause of her death was toluol poisoning.

Von Aesch had a criminal record and was sentenced to 15 months in jail in 1961 after trying to extort ten thousand Swiss francs from a businessman in Zurich by threatening to kidnap his young son. He sent him a letter saying "...how terrible must it be, to live through the day not knowing if your dear Geni will return from day care..." (translated).

In 1990 he married and moved to Benimantell, a village 15 km from Benidorm in Spain. Police in St. Gallen have also re-opened enquiries into the disappearances of five other girls who disappeared in the area before von Aesch moved to Spain.

Suspected in the McCann case 
Von Aesch was also briefly a suspect in the disappearance of Madeleine McCann. He was thought to be close to Praia da Luz when Madeleine McCann disappeared. A white van with Spanish number plates matching the description of von Aesch's was seen parked for several days in front of the McCann's apartment. The van was not seen again after Madeleine disappeared.

In 2013, Scotland Yard officers, as part of their ongoing review, travelled to St. Gallen to investigate possible links between the two crimes. Swiss police said that no such links had been established.

Notes 

2007 deaths
Swiss kidnappers
Swiss criminals
Suicides by firearm in Switzerland
Year of birth missing
2007 suicides